This article summarizes the events related to the world of poker in 1988.

Major tournaments

1988 World Series of Poker 

Johnny Chan wins the main tournament for the second time in a row.

1988 Super Bowl of Poker 

Stu Ungar wins the main event, becoming the first player to win the super bowl a second time.

Poker Hall of Fame 

Doyle Brunson and Jack Straus are inducted.

Deaths 

 August 17: Jack Straus (Born on June 16, 1930)

See also 

 Chronology of poker

References 

Poker by year